Kicking the National Habit is the debut album from British dance-rock duo Grand National. The album was released in the United Kingdom on 24 May 2004 by Sunday Best Records, and then in the United States almost two years later in March 2006. The US edition comes with seven bonus tracks, including remixes by The Glimmers and Sasha.

Track listing

Singles
 "Peanut Dreams" (a.k.a. Grand National EP) (18 December 2003)
 "Peanut Dreams" / "Playing in the Distance" / "Criminal" / "Drink to Moving On"
 "Talk Amongst Yourselves" (19 April 2004)
 b/w "Rub Your Potion" / "Leaves"
 "Cherry Tree" (2 August 2004)
 b/w "Rabbit Facts" / "Lay Me Down"
 "Drink to Moving On" (1 November 2004)
 b/w "Strange Magnificent Noise" / "Sixty Seven Up" / "Drink to Moving On" (Enhanced Video)
 "Playing in the Distance" (29 August 2005)
 "Playing in the Distance" (Elliot James Remix Radio Edit) / "Your Rules Obey" / "Playing in the Distance" (Glimmmix) / "Talk Amongst Yourselves" (Sasha Remix)

References

2004 albums
Grand National (band) albums
Sunday Best (music company) albums